The One Pillar Pagoda, formally belongs to an architecture complex called  (延祐寺) which means Extend Bless pagoda. The pagoda is a historic Buddhist temple in the central Ba Đình district (near the Thăng Long Citadel), Hanoi, the capital of Vietnam. The original pagoda was built in 1049, had some additions and was perfected in 1105. It is regarded alongside the Perfume Temple, as one of Vietnam's two most iconic temples.

History

Lý dynasty 
The temple was built by Emperor Lý Thái Tông, who ruled from 1028 to 1054. According to the court records, Lý Thái Tông was childless and dreamt that he met the bodhisattva Avalokiteshvara, who handed him a baby son while seated on a lotus flower. Lý Thái Tông then married a peasant girl that he had met, and she bore him a son. The emperor constructed the temple in gratitude for this in 1049, having been told by a monk named Thiền Tuệ to build the temple, by erecting a pillar in the middle of a lotus pond, similar to the one he saw in the dream.

The temple was located in what was then the Tây Cấm Garden in Thạch Bảo, Vĩnh Thuận district in the capital Thăng Long (now known as Hanoi). Before the pagoda was opened, prayers were held for the longevity of the monarch. During the Lý dynasty era, the temple was the site of an annual royal ceremony on the occasion of Vesak, the birthday of Gautama Buddha. A Buddha-bathing ceremony was held annually by the monarch, and it attracted monks and laymen alike to the ceremony. The monarch would then free a bird, which was followed by the people.

The temple was renovated in 1105 by Emperor Lý Nhân Tông and a bell was cast and an installation was attempted in 1109. However, the bell, which was regarded as one of the four major capital works of Vietnam at the time, was much too large and heavy, and could not be installed. Since it could not be tolled while left on the ground, it was moved into the countryside and deposited in farmland adjacent to Nhất Trụ Temple. This land was widely inhabited by turtles, so the bell came to be known as Chuông Quy Điền, which means Bell of the Turtle Farmland. At the start of the 15th century, Vietnam was invaded and occupied by the Ming dynasty. In 1426, the future Emperor Lê Lợi attacked and dispersed the Chinese forces, and while the Ming were in retreat and low on weapons, their commanding general ordered that the bell be smelted, so that the copper could be used for manufacturing weaponry.

After Lý dynasty 
During Nguyễn dynasty, the pagoda was restored and rebuilt in 1840-1850 and 1922.

The pagoda was dynamited in 1954. Contrary to what is commonly written, it was not destroyed by the French, but by a Vietnamese Lieutenant of the French Army who was severely punished.  In 1955, Ministry of Culture of Democratic Republic of Vietnam restored the pagoda and the Lotus Station based on the architectural style that Nguyễn dynasty had left.

Architecture

Original architecture 
There were some additions and be perfected in 1105 according to Đại Việt sử ký toàn thư:"Yi You (乙酉), (Long Phù) the fifth year (1105 AD), Song Chongning the fourth year. [...] At that time, the emperor (Lý Thánh Tông) repaired Diên Hựu pagoda to be more beautiful than before, dug Liên Hoa Đài lake (Lotus Station's lake), called Linh Chiểu lake. Outside the lake, there was a corridor running around, outside the corridor dug another lake called Bích Trì Lake, built bridges to cross. In front of the temple yard built stupa."

In the 1999 research paper, the folk culture researcher Nguyễn Hùng Vĩ gave evidence to prove: the One Pillar Pagoda's (Liên Hoa Đài's) architecture is similar to the ruin stone pillar of Dạm Pagoda. According to Dr. Trần Trọng Dương, the original architecture of Diên Hựu Pagoda is a geometric configuration of symbols of Buddhism called Mandala.

According to the research results in more than 20 years, on October 10, 2020, the group of researchers, architects and painters - SEN Heritage held a seminar to propose a plan to re-establish the original architecture. of Diên Hựu pagoda based on the Lý dynasty's architectural style. The center of the structure complex is Liên Hoa Đài (Lotus Station - One Pillar pagoda) with the structure of an hexagonal on one pillar lotus flowers building. The group used 3D images and virtual reality to present their research result. The seminar was attended by experts such as the historian Dương Trung Quốc, researcher Nguyen Hung Vi, Dr. Tran Trong Duong, and the press.

Building Restoration in 1955 
The temple is built of wood on a single stone pillar 1.25 m in diameter and 4 m in height, and it is designed to resemble a lotus blossom, which is a Buddhist symbol of purity, since a lotus blossoms in a muddy pond. In 1954, the French Union forces destroyed the pagoda before withdrawing from Vietnam after the First Indochina War. It was rebuilt afterwards.

A replica was built in Thủ Đức in Saigon in the late 1950s and early 1960s.

See also
List of Buddhist temples in Hanoi

References

External links 

 Photos of the One Pillar Pagoda
 One Pillar Pagoda in Hanoi

11th-century Buddhist temples
Buddhist temples in Hanoi
Pagodas in Vietnam